George Amsis is an Israeli-Arab footballer, currently playing for Hapoel Bnei Lod.

Career
Amsis grew in Gadna Tel Aviv, and moved to Bnei Yehuda upon reaching senior age, in 2009. After two years with Bnei Yehuda, Amsis moved to play for Liga Leumit club Maccabi Herzliya, for which he played one season, moving to Hapoel Bnei Lod at the beginning of the next season.

Amsis stayed with Bnei Lod for three seasons, winning the Toto Cup Leumit in 2015 with the club.  In January 2016, Amsis transferred to Hapoel Nazareth Illit.

Honours
Toto Cup Leumit (1):
2014–15

References

External links

1990 births
Living people
Israeli footballers
Bnei Yehuda Tel Aviv F.C. players
Maccabi Herzliya F.C. players
Hapoel Bnei Lod F.C. players
Hapoel Nof HaGalil F.C. players
Hapoel Marmorek F.C. players
Hapoel Rishon LeZion F.C. players
Nordia Jerusalem F.C. players
Liga Leumit players
Israeli Premier League players
Footballers from Jaffa
Association football forwards